Maria Teresa Bovick Tambis (born May 18, 1984), better known by her screen name Aleck Bovick, is a Filipino actress.

Personal life
Her father was Filipino and her mother was half-German. She was in a relationship with Filipino actor Carlo Maceda from 2005 to 2008.

Career
Bovick's home network is GMA Network, but she also does projects on TV5 and ABS-CBN
Bovick started her career in 1999 when she starred Beh Bote Nga.
In 2002, Bovick starred in Habang Kapiling Ka as Liway, a sexy woman who was hired to spy on Olivia's family and who will fall in love with Jonas (Zoren Legaspi).
Two years later in 2004, she reappeared on television starring in Maid in Heaven and Panday.
She then went to guest in Pinoy Big Brother: Celebrity Edition.
Then in 2009, she returned to GMA Network to star in Daisy Siete (Tarzariray: Amazonang Kikay). 
Bovick then guested on TV5 when she appeared on Star Confessions.
In 2014, Bovick returned to ABS-CBN and she had a recurring role in the long-running family television series, Be Careful With My Heart as Lucinda Quijano, Joni's mother (Shy Carlos).
In early 2015, she starred in the afternoon TV series Nasaan Ka Nang Kailangan Kita as Ching Galvez who is Cecilia's best friend (Vina Morales) and Joel's mother (Joshua Garcia).

Filmography

Film
Manila (2009)
Naglalayag (2004)
U-Belt (2004) .... Sarah
Kerida (2003)
Hiram (2003) .... Mila
Masarap na pugad (2002) .... Koala
Tampisaw (2002) .... Marites
Kaulayaw (2002)

Television

What We Could Be (GMA-7; 2022): Melba Macaraeg
Flower of Evil (Kapamilya Channel / A2Z; 2022): Josie Medina
Init sa Magdamag (Kapamilya Channel / A2Z / TV5; 2021): Celia Macatangay
Kadenang Ginto (ABS-CBN; 2018-2019): Myrna Bartolome
Maalaala Mo Kaya (ABS-CBN; 2017)
FPJ's Ang Probinsyano (ABS-CBN; 2017): Cora 
Dear Uge (GMA-7; 2017)
Maalaala Mo Kaya: Fifty Pesos (ABS-CBN; 2016)
The Greatest Love (2016): Aling Thelma Alcantara 
Maalaala Mo Kaya: Toga (ABS-CBN; 2016)
Ricky Lee's Nasaan Ka Nang Kailangan Kita (ABS-CBN; 2015): Chynna "Ching" Galvez 
Be Careful With My Heart (ABS-CBN; 2012-2014): Abby's teacher 
Star Confessions (TV5)
Tarzariray: Amazonang Kikay (GMA-7; January 19, 2009)
Pinoy Big Brother: Celebrity Edition 1 (ABS-CBN; 2006)
Carlo J. Caparas' Ang Panday
Maid in Heaven (ABS-CBN; 2004)
Habang Kapiling Ka (2002-2003)
Beh Bote Nga (GMA-7; 1999)

Discography

Singles
 Baso ni Maria
 Gatas ni Papa
 Gusto Ko Ng Nota
 Prinsesa
 Sapatos Ni Sion
 Astig Ang Syota Ko
 Sakyan Mo Ako 
 Ayoko Ng Bitin
 Nota

References

External links

Aleck Bovick Joins Tarzariray, pinayshare.com
Profile, philstar.com
Profile, abs-cbnnews.com

1981 births
Filipino television actresses
Filipino people of German descent
Living people
ABS-CBN personalities
Star Magic
Star Magic personalities
Pinoy Big Brother contestants
GMA Network personalities
TV5 (Philippine TV network) personalities